The Winter Park Diamond Dawgs are a wood bat collegiate summer baseball league team located in Winter Park, Florida.  The team is a member of the Florida Collegiate Summer League (FCSL) and plays its home games at Alfond Stadium.  The team is an inaugural member of the FCSL.

History
The Winter Park Diamond Dawgs and the Sanford River Rats were two of the inaugural teams of the FCSL.  The team did not qualify for the championship game in 2004 or 2005. In 2006, however, the team won the FCSL championship game 4-3 over the Altamonte Springs Snappers.  The team finished fourth in the league in both 2007 and 2008, not qualifying for the championship game in either season.

Playoff Appearances

References

External links
 FCSL website

Amateur baseball teams in Florida
Baseball teams established in 2004
Winter Park, Florida
2004 establishments in Florida